Istadegi (also Romanized as Īstādegī and Estādegī; also known as Estegī, Istegī, Saiyidān, and Seyyedān) is a village in Aghili-ye Shomali Rural District, Aghili District, Gotvand County, Khuzestan Province, Iran. At the 2006 census, its population was 817, in 167 families.

References 

Populated places in Gotvand County